Rhydymwyn F.C. is a football club from Rhydymwyn, Wales. They lasted played in the Ardal Leagues North West, which is at tier 3 of the Welsh football pyramid, before resigning from the league in September 2022. Their home ground was Dolfechlas Road.

History
Rhydymwyn Football Club was founded in 1911.  They came into existence, playing in local soccer, in the old Halkyn and Clwyd Leagues. They would remain in these leagues until moving up to the Welsh Alliance League in 1990. They immediately consolidated their progress by finishing fourth in their first season, and also reaching the final of the Cookson Cup. Their second campaign saw them finish in sixth place, and also reach the final of the North Wales Coast FA Challenge Cup, where they lost 2-1 to the then HFS Loans League side, Colwyn Bay. They finished fourth again in 1993, and also won the Alves Cup. The following year saw them third on goal difference, after a three-way tie with Llangefni Town and Llanfairpll. The 1994–95 season saw them capture the Welsh Alliance League title, and gain promotion to the Cymru Alliance League]. They also won the FAW Trophy, beating Taffs Wells 1-0 in the final played at Caersws. The 1995–96 season saw them finish a respectable fifth in the Cymru Alliance League. They also retained the FAW Trophy, beating Penrhyncoch at Newtown. 1996–97 saw them finish second in the league behind Rhayader Town, before taking the title in the 1997–98 season. Various reasons prevented the club from being promoted to the League of Wales. The club has progressed, not only on the field but off it as well. They obtained a £75,000 pavilion funded by Delyn Borough Council, and also received a £26,000 Sport Lot Award to extend their function room. Much of their progress was down to then manager Ken Knowles and a committee made up of committed local people. When Ken Knowles decided to retire after eleven seasons in charge, the club decided to appoint a player/manager from  within their ranks. Unfortunately, the plan backfired, and the club had to resign from the Cymru Alliance League, due mainly to a lack of players. After returning to the Welsh Alliance League, the club was successful again. In the 2003–04 season they reached the finals of both the Barritt and Cookson Cups. They won the Cookson Cup but narrowly lost the Barritt Cup, under the caretaker manager, Phil Eaton.

The following season saw them strongly contest the league championship, only to lose by one point to eventual champions, Bodedern. They also reached the final of the FAW Trophy, losing 3–1 to Swansea-based side West End at Rhayader. Since those successes, the club struggled under a different manager, with mid-table finishes within the Welsh Alliance. Success returned to the club in the 2007–08 season when they defeated Barmouth and Dyffyn United to win the Barritt Cup for the first time at Farrar Road, Bangor. The 2008–09 season saw a big improvement in the Welsh Alliance when they finished runners-up behind Bethesda Athletic. The momentum continued in 2009–10 season and the club stayed in pole position, winning eight out of the first nine games winning promotion back to the Huws Gray Alliance with an overall record of 21 wins, 4 draws and only 5 defeats. In that first season back in the Huws Gray Alliance things didn't go to plan and at the end of the season the club dropped out of the Huws Gray Alliance with just 18 points, finishing in 14th position. The club found themselves back in the third tier of Welsh football but this time in the Welsh National League rather than the Welsh Alliance due to new boundary changes coming into force. The club also decided to appoint Daniel Seamarks as their new manager and it was his task to rebuild the team and fortunes. In that first season Rhydymwyn finished in a highly respectful second position and they were able to gain promotion back to the Huws Gray Alliance as champions FC Cefn chose to withdraw their application for Promotion. So in season 2012-13 the see saw affect continued with Rhydymwyn back in the Huws Gray alliance. Rhydymwyn secured 28 points that season and ended up finishing in 14th position. This time the club knew that they would be safe as only 2 clubs were going to gain promotion and Rhyl were going to be promoted to the Welsh Premier as champions of the Huws Gray Alliance. Rhydymwyn had been higher up the table earlier in the season and their league position slipped as security was guaranteed. Rhydymwyn have now got the task of building on that and will be looking to move further up the table in season 2013-14 despite limited resources and funds.

2014-15 was a sad season in the history of Rhydymwyn because of unforeseen circumstances they were not able to raise a team, and the team folded. In 2016 the club reformed and entered the Welsh National League (Wrexham Area).

Honours

Leagues
Cymru Alliance
Champions: 1997–98
Runners-up: 1998–99
Welsh Alliance League
Champions: 1994–95, 2009–10
Clwyd Football League
Premier Division – Champions: 2000–01
Division One – Runners-up: 1981–82
Division Two – Champions: 1979–80
Division Three – Runners-up: 1977–78

Cups
FAW Welsh Trophy – Winners: 1994–95, 1995–96
FAW Welsh Trophy – Runners-up: 2004–05
North Wales Coast FA Junior Challenge Cup – Winners: 1983–84
NWCFA Challenge Cup – Runners-up: 1991–92
Alves Cup – Winners: 1992–93
Barrit Cup – Winners: 2007–08
Barrit Cup – Runners-up: 2003–04
Cookson Cup – Winners: 2003–04
Cookson Cup - Runners-up: 1990–91

Backroom Staff

First Team Manager - Anthony Weaver
First Team Head Coach - James Duff
First Team Coach - Stuart Tarren
First Team Physio - Molly Wilson

References

External links
Club website
Rhydymwyn Football Club on Welsh Alliance League

Football clubs in Wales
Welsh Alliance League clubs
Association football clubs established in 1878
Cymru Alliance clubs
Welsh National League (Wrexham Area) Premier Division clubs
Ardal Leagues clubs
Welsh League North clubs
Clwyd Football League clubs